Marciel Rodger Back  also known as  Marciel  (born 20 March 1982 in Itapiranga, Santa Catarina) is a Brazilian professional footballer who plays for Americano Futebol Clube.

Marciel last played for Samsunspor in the Turkish Super Lig.

References

External links
 Guardian's Stats Centre

1982 births
Living people
Brazilian footballers
Fluminense FC players
Associação Atlética Internacional (Limeira) players
CR Vasco da Gama players
Samsunspor footballers
Macaé Esporte Futebol Clube players
Brazilian expatriate footballers
Expatriate footballers in Turkey
Brazilian people of German descent
Association football midfielders